Nizhnyanka is a rural locality (a khutor) in Terkinskoye Rural Settlement, Serafimovichsky District, Volgograd Oblast, Russia. The population was 24 as of 2010. There are 2 streets.

Geography 
Nizhnyanka is located 49 km northeast of Serafimovich (the district's administrative centre) by road. Kundryuchkin is the nearest rural locality.

References 

Rural localities in Serafimovichsky District